Thein Than Win (born 25 May 1991), is a Burmese professional footballer who plays as a left-back for Myanmar National League club Yangon United and Myanmar national football team.

He played for Kanbawza FC in Myanmar National League. On 11 December 2019, he moved to Yangon United FC on 1-year contract.

References

1991 births
Living people
Burmese footballers
Myanmar international footballers
Kanbawza F.C. players
Association football defenders